The South Australian Railways 750 class was a class of 2-8-2 steam locomotives operated by the South Australian Railways.

History
With an acute shortage of motive power following World War II, the South Australian Railways were able to purchase 10 Victorian Railways N class locomotives in 1951 which had been in service for only a few months. They replaced Rx class locomotives on branch line services particularly over the light lines in the Murray Mallee radiating from Tailem Bend. Withdrawals began in July 1961 with the last withdrawn in September 1967.

The National Railway Museum, Port Adelaide has preserved 752 After running the last passenger train to Willunga in 1969.

References

External links

NBL locomotives
Railway locomotives introduced in 1951
750
2-8-2 locomotives
Broad gauge locomotives in Australia
Freight locomotives